Otgonbayar is a Mongolian surname and given name. Notable people with the name include:

Dambyn Otgonbayar (born 1973), Mongolian guitarist
Ishdorjiin Otgonbayar (born 1968), Mongolian football coach
Luvsanlkhündegiin Otgonbayar (born 1982), Mongolian runner
Otgonbayar Oyunbaatar (born 1993), Mongolian footballer
Ravsalyn Otgonbayar (born 1955), Mongolian boxer

Mongolian-language surnames
Mongolian given names